XHPUGC-FM is a radio station on 96.3 FM in Úrsulo Galván-Cardel, Veracruz, Mexico. It is owned by Multimedios Radio and carries its La Lupe Spanish variety hits format.

History
XHPUGC was awarded in the IFT-4 radio auction of 2017 and came to air May 4, 2018.

All three Multimedios stations in Veracruz flipped from La Caliente to La Lupe on November 6, 2020.

References

Radio stations in Veracruz
Radio stations established in 2018
2018 establishments in Mexico
Multimedios Radio
Spanish-language radio stations